Gnome King Kyrië (Dutch: Kabouterkoning Kyrië) is, according to local folklore, the leader of the legendary gnomes (kabouters) which lived in the Campine region of the province of North Brabant, the Netherlands. These gnomes had their base in the village of Hoogeloon. From Hoogeloon the gnomes often made journeys in the neighboring lands. According to tradition the Gnome King Kyrië lived on the Kerkakkers in the Kabouterberg (Gnome Mountain) also known as Duivelsberg (Devil's Mountain), a tumulus located in the Koebosch forest, slightly northeast of Hoogeloon.

The gnomes of the Campine were helpful creatures who helped mostly the farmers and the households in the Campine and also in the neighboring lands of the Peel and the Meierij. They came by night and did not want to be seen by people. If people did see them, they were punished by the gnomes. One story tells of an inquisitive farmer who spied on the gnomes and later became blind in one eye as a punishment.

The death of Kyrië 
One day, Gnome King Kyrië was shot by a hunter in the heathlands of Riethoven (most sources name the winter of 1952/1953, some place his death in the winter of 1951/1952). He had just enough strength to reach the Duivelsberg (Devil's Mountain) where the gnomes lived. The hunter looked for what he had shot down, when he heard the shocked gnomes say: "Kyrië is dead". The sad message that their king had died spread quickly among all gnome settlements in the region. Gnome King Kyrië was buried somewhere in Hoogeloon. After the death of their king, all the gnomes left the area to an unknown destination. Nobody has ever since heard or seen these Campine gnomes.

Statue 
In Hoogeloon, a village pump with a statue of Gnome King Kyrië on it was erected on the Valensplein in 1985. It is designed by Gubbels. On 9 April 2001 the pump and statue were moved to another place on the same square after a reconstruction of the Valensplein. At the same time a special 'Koning Kyrië Kruidenbitter', a bitter, was introduced.

References

External links

Dutch legendary creatures
Mythological kings
Gnomes